is a Japanese professional footballer who plays as a full back for  club Avispa Fukuoka.

Career
Itsuki Oda joined J1 League club Kashima Antlers in 2017. On July 12, he debuted in Emperor's Cup (v Montedio Yamagata).

Oda was twice loaned out to J2 league clubs, firstly Machida Zelvia in the 2020 season and secondly to JEF United Chiba in the 2021 season. He returned to Kashima for the 2022 season but only played a handful of games.

On 26 January 2023, it was announced that Oda would be joining Avispa Fukuoka.

Career statistics

Club
.

References

External links
Profile at Kashima Antlers

1998 births
Living people
Association football people from Saga Prefecture
Japanese footballers
J1 League players
J2 League players
Kashima Antlers players
FC Machida Zelvia players
JEF United Chiba players
Avispa Fukuoka players
Association football defenders